Plump DJs are an English dance music duo consisting of Lee Rous and Andy Gardner, considered to be early pioneers of the breakbeat genre in late 1990s. Throughout the 2000s, they have been very prolific creatively, releasing many celebrated underground singles, albums compilations. Also remixing the records of well-known dance music mega stars such as Deadmau5, Mark Ronson, Fatboy Slim, Orbital and the Stanton Warriors. They cemented their international status through their 10-year residency at London's famous superclub Fabric, in a career that has taken the duo to the largest stages on all four corners of this earth to perform.

Career

1990–2003: Beginnings 
Lee Rous and Andy Gardner met at proto-breakbeat label Freskanova in west London in the late 1990s. Gardner was making music with Matt Cantor from the Freestylers, and Rous was DJing at and promoting the Passenger nights in Kings Cross.

Their first release together, "Plump Chunks"/"Electric Disco", came out on Finger Lickin' Records in 1999. When they released the A Plump Night Out album – basically a live DJ mix featuring their own original music – they began to achieve international fame.

The Plump DJs were asked by dance music culture magazine Mixmag to mix their February 2001 cover CD, which they called Elastic Breaks. Soon after, in May, they released a two-CD mix compilation called Urban Underground and in February 2003 they produced the eighth album in the FabricLive series for the acclaimed London venue.

Their artist album Eargasm was released in July 2003 and featured synthesizer pioneer Gary Numan and Lamb vocalist Louise Rhodes. They began a quarterly residency at Fabric, running their own Eargasm nights at the London club, and secured placings in the DJ magazine Top 100 DJs list and won a multiple Breakspoll awards.

2008–2011: Formation of own label 
In 2008, they rebranded their Fabric night, calling it Headthrash after their latest album and opening up the music policy to other styles apart from breakbeat. Their DJ sets and productions began changing accordingly, and the four-deck live DJ show they developed allowed them to pull off more creative mixes in clubs and at festivals such as Coachella, Glastonbury, and Skolbeats.

In 2009, their contract ended with Finger Lickin' Records and they signed to release a double-CD post-breaks compilation on the Global Underground series. They released the "My Hi Tops" single on the Global Underground imprint, too.

In 2010, the Plump DJs began releasing material on their own label Grand Hotel. They have also become one of the label's new residents at events held at Fabric and Matter nightclubs. Their recent remixes have been more eclectic with artists such as Deadmau5, Dave Spoon, and the Stanton Warriors.

In 2011, Rous and Gardner signed acts SUBMO & Bonsai Kat to their Grand Hotel label, and continued releasing music through this platform. Their advanced 4deck DJ live show toured extensively in the UK and abroad, and their Light Fantastic club record became a 'tune of the year' in Mixmag. This year saw them hold regular sold out shows at London recently opened XOYO nightclub.

2012–present 
2012 marked the release of "Gobbstopper" and "Dont Stay in Mix" showing a return to form. This in turn fueled the release of their Dirty Weekend album on GHR and further sellout shows at their now beloved NEST and XOYO venues in London. They continue to tour the UK club and festival circuit and worldwide now regularly in the US and Canada. The duo's remixing services have been called upon by Moby, Orbital, Mark Ronson and The Loops of Fury.

2013 then saw continuing support for the duo, as they developed their sound further after their inspirational first tours of the US & Canada. Collaborating with UK soul singer Juliette Ashby. "You Belong to Us" the single struck a chord with London design team Baked Agency, and was presented with a forward thinking drone cam video, hitting the streets with rave reviews from Vice's Noisey blog.

This paved the way for a bumper 2014, towards the end of which the duo turned their attention, reviving their breakbeat sound.

Discography

Studio albums

Mix albums

Note: Elastic Breaks and Breakbeat Annual were both released as free CDs in separate issues of Mixmag.

Charting singles

Awards and nominations

References

External links
Plump DJs website

Breakbeat music groups
Musical groups from London
English house music duos
Electronic dance music duos
Remixers
DJs from London
Club DJs
DJ duos